"The World Was Wide Enough" is the penultimate song from Act 2 of the musical Hamilton, based on the life of Alexander Hamilton, which premiered on Broadway in 2015. Lin-Manuel Miranda wrote both the music and lyrics to the song. The song recounts the events of the 1804 duel in Weehawken, New Jersey between then–Vice President Aaron Burr and former Secretary of the Treasury Hamilton.

Synopsis

The song begins in Burr's perspective. Burr states ten facts about the duel (particularly facts that made it clear that Hamilton had the advantage) as a reprise of "Ten Duel Commandments" plays, noting that the duel is taking place in the same spot where Hamilton's son was killed in a duel. Burr also states that he will not allow Hamilton to kill him because he doesn't want his daughter to become an orphan and also because he is tired of waiting for his moment (reflecting Hamilton's own methodology from "My Shot"). He shoots Hamilton and as the bullet approaches him, time freezes and Hamilton breaks into a soliloquy, wondering if his death will be his legacy. He then realizes that a legacy by definition is something no one ever really lives to see as well as something no one can control, but finds peace by mentioning some of his deceased friends and family who await him "on the other side" before urging his wife Eliza to "take your time". With that said, in a mix of fear, confidence, and sadness, he throws away his shot by slowly aiming his pistol at the sky while saying "Raise a glass to freedom." Time resumes as Burr, who was not expecting Hamilton to throw away his shot, shouts "wait!" as the bullet finally hits Hamilton. A devastated Burr then discusses the aftermath of the duel, as he was ushered away from his opponent and was then told that he should probably hide, so he retreated to a bar for a drink. He laments that he is now doomed to be the villain in Hamilton's history rather than being appraised on his own achievements, and informs the audience that Hamilton died not long after in the company of Eliza and her sister Angelica. He then regretfully states that he should have "known the world was wide enough for both Hamilton and me."

According to the credits of the 2020 filmed version of Hamilton, this song contains elements of "Ten Crack Commandments" by The Notorious B.I.G., and the writers of that song also share in the writing credit of "The World Was Wide Enough".

Analysis
The song takes its title and inspiration from a quote by Burr: "Had I read Sterne more and Voltaire less, I should have known the world was wide enough for both Hamilton and me".
This was a reference to a scene in Sterne's Tristam Shandy. The character  Uncle Toby tells a fly, "Go poor Devil, get thee gone, why should I hurt thee? This world is surely wide enough to hold thee and me."

It features reprises and leitmotifs from multiple other songs in the musical, including "My Shot", “The Story of Tonight", "Wait for It", “Ten Duel Commandments" and “One Last Time". It also marks the last time in which Hamilton speaks on stage. The song features a variety of musical styles, from the fast-paced and frenetic beginning to the slow, poetic ponderings of Hamilton prior to his death.

Critical reception
The Young Folks had it ranked as the 16th best song in the musical.

Huffington Post praised the "poignant rumination on death and legacy", and said that the song was effective as it makes Burr complex and real, rather than a mere villain.

Legacy
Democratic Presidential Candidate and former Secretary of State Hillary Clinton quoted from the song at the DNC during her 2016 Presidential Campaign, saying "Let our legacy be about 'planting seeds in a garden you never get to see'", a reference to Hamilton's soliloquy. Lin-Manuel Miranda responded positively on Twitter, stating "I'm with her".

References

2015 songs
Songs from Hamilton (musical)
Works about dueling